The following article contains a list of acronyms and initials used in the waste management industry.

A
AATF   Approved Authorised Treatment Facility 
ABPO	Animal By-Products Order 
ABPR   Animal By-Products Regulations
ABS    Acrylonitrile Butadiene Styrene
ACE    Alliance of Beverage Cartons and the Environment
ACL	Approved Carriers List
ACM    Asbestos Containing Material
ACoP	Approved Code of Practice
ACP    Advisory Committee on Packaging
AD	Anaerobic Digestion
ADBA   Anaerobic Digestion & Biogas Association
ADI	Acceptable Daily Intake
ADR	Accord Europeen Relatif aux Transport International des Marchandises Dangereuses par Route European agreement concerning the international carriage of dangerous goods by road
AE     Approved Exporter
AfOR   Association for Organics Recycling
ALANI	Association of Local Authorities in Northern Ireland
ALARP  As Low As Reasonably Practicable
ALCO	Association of London Cleansing Officers
ANPR   Automatic Number Plate Recognition
APC	Air Pollution Control
APCR   Air Pollution Control Residue
APSRG	Associate Parliamentary Sustainable Resource Group
AR	Accredited Reprocessor
ARF    Advanced Recycling Fee
ARM	Alternative Raw Material
ASBO	Anti Social Behaviour Order
ASR    Automotive Shredder Residue
ASSURE	Association for Sustainable Use and Recovery of Resources
ATEX	Atmosphères Explosives Directive 94/9/EC
ATF	Authorised Treatment Facility (e.g. for the treatment of end-of-life vehicles (see ELV) and waste electrical and electronic equipment (see WEEE))
ATT    Advanced Thermal Treatment
AV	Abandoned Vehicle/s
AVAC   Automated Vacuum Collection
AWC    Alternate Weekly Collections
AWCS   Automated Waste Collection System
AWTT   Alternative Waste Treatment Technologies
AWP	Area Waste Plan

B
BAN    Basel Action Network
BANANA Build absolutely nothing anywhere near anything
BAT (NEEC)	Best available technique (not entailing excessive costs)
BATRRT	Best Available Treatment Recycling and Recovery Technology
BCS    Batteries Compliance Scheme
BDF    Biodiesel fuel
BFR	Brominated Flame Retardant
BIFM   British Institute of Facilities Management
BMRA   British Metals Recycling Association
BMT    Biological Mechanical Treatment
BMW	Biodegradable Municipal Waste
BOD	Biological Oxygen Demand
BOO	Build Own Operate
BOT    Build Operate Transfer
BPEO	Best Practicable Environmental Option
BPF	British Plastics Federation
BPPO	Best Practicable Planning Option
BRBA   Buy Recycled Business Alliance (Australia)
BREEAM Building Research Establishment Environmental Assessment Method
BREF	BAT Reference Note
BREW(p)	Business Resource Efficiency and Waste programme
BRITE	Better Regulation in the Environment (Environment Agency initiative)
BRE    Building Research Establishment
BSI	British Standards Institute
BSI PAS 100 Specification for composted materials
BSI PAS 101 Recovered container glass: Specification for quality and guidance for good practice in collection
BSI PAS 102 Specification for processed glass for selected secondary end markets
BSI PAS 103 Collected waste plastics packaging: Specification for quality and guidance for good practice in collection and preparation for recycling
BSI PAS 104 Wood recycling in the panelboard manufacturing industry: Specification for quality and guidance for good practice for the supply of post consumer wood for consumption in the manufacture of panelboard products
BSI PAS 105 Recovered paper sourcing and quality for UK end markets
BSI PAS 107 Specification for the manufacture and storage of size reduced tyre materials
BSI PAS 108 Specification for the production of tyre bales for use in construction
BSI PAS 109 Specification for the production of recycled gypsum from waste plasterboard
BSI PAS 110 Specification for whole digestate, separated liquor and separated fibre derived from the anaerobic digestion of source-segregated biodegradable materials
BSI PAS 111 Specification for the requirements and test methods for processing waste wood
BSI PAS 141 Reuse of used and waste electrical and electronic equipment (UEEE and WEEE). Process management - Specification
BVPI	Best Value Performance Indicator
BVPP	Best Value Performance Plan

C
CA	Civic amenity site
CAFÉ	Clean Air For Europe programme
CATNAP	Cheapest Available Technology Narrowly Avoiding Prosecution
CATNIP	Cheapest Available Technology Not Involving Prosecution
CAVE   Citizens against virtually everything
CBI	Confederation of British Industry
CBM    Compressed Biomethane
CCGT   Combined cycle gas turbine
CCHP   Combined cooling, heating and power
CCL	Climate Change Levy
CCT	Compulsory Competitive Tendering
C&D	Construction and demolition (e.g. C&D waste)
CDG(CPL)	Carriage of Dangerous Goods by Road and Rail (Classification, Packaging and Labelling) Regulations 1994
CEC	Commission of the European Communities
CEMP   Construction Environmental Management Plan
CEN	Comite Europeen de Normalisation (European Committee for Standardization)
CEWEP  Confederation of European Waste-to-Energy Plants
CFC	Chlorofluorocarbon
CfSH   Code for Sustainable Homes
CHEM	Container Handling Equipment Manufacturers
CHIP	Chemicals (Hazard Information and Packaging for Supply) Regulations 
CHP	Combined heat and power
CHPA   Combined Heat and Power Association
C&I    Commercial and industrial (e.g. C&I waste)
CIPFA	Chartered Institute of Public Finance and Accountancy
CIWEM	Chartered Institution of Water and Environmental Management
CIWM	Chartered Institution of Wastes Management
CIWMB	California Integrated Waste Management Board
CL:AIRE	Contaminated Land: Application In Real Environments CLAIRE
CLEA	Contaminated Land Exposure Assessment
CLO    Compost-like output
CLR	Contaminated Land Register
CNEA   Clean Neighbourhoods and Environment Act
COD	Chemical oxygen demand or certificate of destruction
COMAH	Control of Major Accident Hazards 
COPA	Control of Pollution Act  
COPLR	Code of Practice for Litter and Refuse
CoRWM  Committee on Radioactive Waste Management
COSHH	Control of Substances Hazardous to Health
CoTC	Certificate of Technical Competence
CPA	Comprehensive Performance Assessment
CRC    CRC Energy Efficiency Scheme (formerly the Carbon Reduction Commitment)
CRC    Community recycling centre
CRN	Community Recycling Network
CRNS   Community Recycling Network for Scotland
CRR    Campaign for Real Recycling
CRT    Cathode-ray tube
CSER   Corporate, social and environmental responsibilities
CSR	Corporate social responsibility
CSTR   Continuous stirred-tank reactor
CV	Calorific value
CWMRE	Creating Welsh Markets for Recyclates
CWP    Cheshire Waste Partnership
CWR	Controlled Waste Regulations

D
DAC	Dense Asphaltic Concrete
DBFO   Design Build Finance and Operate
DCF	Designated Collection Facility
DCLG   Department for Communities and Local Government
DECC   Department of Energy and Climate Change
DECLG  Department of the Environment, Community and Local Government (Ireland)
DEFRA	Department for Environment, Food and Rural Affairs
DGXI	Directorate General of the European Commission responsible for the Environment
DLGE   Department of Local Government and the Environment (Isle of Man)
DMR    Dry Mixed Recyclables
DoC	Duty of Care
DOENI	Department for the Environment (Northern Ireland)
DRI	Dynamic Respiration Index
DSD    Duales System Deutschland
DSO	Direct Service Organisation
DTI	Department of Trade and Industry
DTLR	Department for Transport, Local Government and the Regions
DTS    Distributor Takeback Scheme
DWP    Dorset Waste Partnership

E
EA	Enforcement Agency
EBRA   European Battery Recycling Association
ECN    European Compost Network
EDIE   Environmental Data Interactive Exchange
eDoC   Electronic Duty of Care
EEA	European Environment Agency
EfW	Energy-from-Waste
EGSB   Expanded Granular Sludge Bed
EHO	Environmental health officer
EHS	Environment & Heritage Service (Northern Ireland)
EIA	Environmental Impact Assessment
EIC	Environmental Industries Commission
EIR	Environmental Information Regulations 
ELSEF  East London Sustainable Energy Facility
ELV	End of Life Vehicles 
ELWA   East London Waste Authority
EMAS	Eco-Management and Audit Scheme
EMS	Environmental Management System
ENTRUST	The European Trust Scheme Regulatory Body
ENCAMS	Environmental Campaigns (umbrella name for former Going for Green and Tidy Britain Group)
EP     Environmental Permit
EPA	Environmental Protection Act or Environmental Protection Agency
EPERN  Electronic Packaging Waste Export Recovery Notes
EPOW   European Pathway to Zero Waste
EPR    Environmental Permitting Regulations
EPRN   Electronic Packaging Waste Recovery Notes
EPS    Expanded Polystyrene
ERFO   European Recovered Fuels Organisation
ERI    Energy Recovery Incineration
ES	Environmental Statement
ESA 	Environmental Services Association 
ESWET  European Suppliers of Waste-to-Energy Technology
ETBC   Electronics TakeBack Coalition
ETRMA  European Tyre & Rubber Manufacturers’ Association
ETS    Emissions Trading Scheme
ETSU	Energy Technology Support Unit
EUHWL	EU Hazardous Waste List (now incorporated into EWC)
EUROPEN        European Organization for Packaging and the Environment
EWC	European Waste Catalogue
EWP    Essex Waste Partnership

F
FABRA  Foodchain & Biomass Renewables Association
FAPP	Fit And Proper Person
FBA    Furnace Bottom Ash
FCC    Fomento de Construcciones y Contratas
FEAD   Fédération Européenne des Activités du Déchet et de l’Environnement  European Federation of Waste Management and Environmental Services 
FEL	Front End Loader
FGT    Flue Gas Treatment
FOE 	Friends of the Earth
FORWARRD	Forum for Waste and Resource Research and Development
FPN    Fixed Penalty Notice
Frag	Fragmentised Waste (e.g. from the vehicle recycling industry)
FTE    Full-time equivalent
FWD    Food Waste Disposer

G
GAIA   Global Alliance for Incinerator Alternatives
GCV    Gross Calorific Value
GHG    Greenhouse Gas
GIB    Green Investment Bank
GIS	Geographical Information System
GLA	Greater London Authority
GMWDA  Greater Manchester Waste Disposal Authority
GWP    Global Warming Potential

H
HCRW	Healthcare Risk Waste
HCW	Healthcare Waste
HDPE	High Density Polyethylene
HFC    Hydrofluorocarbon
HHW	Household Hazardous Waste
HIPS   High Impact Polystyrene
HLW    High Level Waste
HSC	Health and Safety Commission
HSE	Health & Safety Executive
HTI    High Temperature Incineration
HW	    Household waste
HWOL   HazWasteOnline (web-based tool for assessing and classifying hazardous waste)
HWR	Hazardous Waste Regulations
HWRA	Household Waste Recycling Act
HWRC	Household Waste Recycling Centre

I
IBA	Incinerator Bottom Ash
IBAA   Incinerator Bottom Ash Aggregate
ICE	Institution of Civil Engineers
ICER   Industry Council for Electronic Equipment Recycling
ICW    International Catering Waste  (catering waste from means of transport operating internationally)
IED    Industrial Emissions Directive
ILW    Intermediate Level Waste
INCPEN Industry Council for Packaging and the Environment
IPP	Integrated Product Policy
IPPC	Integrated Pollution Prevention and Control
ISRI   Institute of Scrap Recycling Industries
ISWA	International Solid Waste Association
IVC	In-vessel Composting
IWM	Integrated Waste Management or Institute of Wastes Management

J
JMWMS	Joint Municipal Waste Management Strategy
JWA    Joint Waste Authority

K
KAT	Kerbside Assessment Tool

L
LA	Local Authority
LAAPC	Local Authority Air Pollution Control
LACMW  Local Authority Collected Municipal Waste  (household and commercial waste where collected by the local authority and which is similar in nature and composition as required by the Landfill Directive)
LACW   Local Authority Collected Waste  (all waste collected by the local authority. This is a slightly broader concept than LACMW as it would include both this and non-municipal fractions such as construction and demolition waste)
LAPC	Local Air Pollution Control
LARAC	Local Authority Recycling Advisory Committee
LAS    Landfill Allowance Scheme
LASU	Local Authority Support Unit
LATS	Landfill Allowance Trading Scheme
LAWAS	Local Authority Waste Arisings Survey
LAWDC	Local Authority Waste Disposal Company
LCA	Life Cycle Analysis/Assessment
LCF    Landfill Communities Fund
LCW    Low Carbon Waste
LCPD	Large Combustion Plant Directive
LDPE	Low Density Polyethylene
LEA    Local Enforcement Agency
LEL	Lower Explosive Limit
LFD	Landfill Directive
LFG	Landfill Gas
LFT    Landfill Tax
LGA	Local Government Association
LHIP	Landfill and Hazardous Waste Implementation Programme
LIM    Loose Incinerator Metals
LLDPE  Linear Low Density Polyethylene  e.g. plastic wrap and stretch wrap
LLW    Low Level Waste
LOLER	Lifting Operations and Lifting Equipment Regulations 1998
LOW    List of Wastes
LPSA	Local Public Service Agreement
LTCS   Landfill Tax Credit Scheme
LWaRB  London Waste and Recycling Board

M
MTD    Metric Ton per Day
MAC	Maximum Allowable Concentration
MBI    Mass Burn Incineration
MBT	Mechanical Biological Treatment 
MCA    Municipal Collection Authority
MCERTS	Monitoring Certification Scheme
MCDA	Multi Criteria Decision Analysis
MDC	Metropolitan District Council
MDR    Mixed Dry Recyclables
MEL	Maximum Exposure Limit 
MHSWR	Management of Health & Safety at Work Regulations 
MHT    Mechanical Heat Treatment
MMRCV  Multi-Modal Refuse Collection Vehicle
MREC   Materials Recovery and Energy Centre
MRF	Materials Recovery Facility (or Recycling or Factory)
MRWA   Merseyside Recycling and Waste Authority  formerly known as Merseyside Waste Disposal Authority
MSW	Municipal Solid Waste
MSWI   Municipal Solid Waste Incineration
MVDA   Motor Vehicle Dismantlers Association
MWDA   Merseyside Waste Disposal Authority  as of December 2011 renamed as Merseyside Recycling and Waste Authority
MWLP   Minerals and Waste Local Plan
MWMS	Municipal Waste Management Strategy

N
NAWDO	National Association of Waste Disposal Officers
NCAS	National Compliance Assessment Service
NCH	National Clearing House
NCV    Net calorific value
NELVS	Natural End of Life Vehicles
NFFO	Non-Fossil Fuel Obligation
NGG	New Generation Group (CIWM programme renamed New Member Network)
NGO	Non-Governmental Organisation
NHHWF	National Household Hazardous Waste Forum
NIEA   Northern Ireland Environment Agency
NIMBY	Not In My Back-Yard
NISP	National Industrial Symbiosis Programme
NLWA   North London Waste Authority
NOF	New Opportunities Fund
NPWD   National Packaging Waste Database
NRC    Nuclear Regulatory Commission (US)
NSIP   Nationally significant infrastructure project
NVQ	National Vocational Qualification
NWMRF	National Waste Minimisation & Recycling Fund
NWP	National Waste Plan or Norfolk Waste Partnership
NWPA	Nuclear Waste Policy Act

O
OBB    Old Boxboard
OCC    Old Corrugated Containers
ODPM	Office of the Deputy Prime Minister
ODS	Ozone Depleting Substance
OECD	Organisation for Economic Co-operation and Development
OFGEM  Office of Gas and Electricity Markets (Great Britain)
OFWAT  Office of Water Services (England and Wales)
OJEU	Official Journal of the European Union
OMA	Operator Monitoring Assessment
OPRA	Operator Pollution Risk Appraisal
ORA    Oil Recycling Association
OWP    Oxfordshire Waste Partnership

P
PAFA   Packaging and Films Association
pams   Periodicals and Magazines
PAS 	Publicly Available Specification
PAYT   Pay As You Throw
PCB	Polychlorinated Biphenyl
PCS    Producer Compliance Scheme
PELVs	Premature End of Life Vehicles  (relatively new cars which have not survived the expected life span that most vehicle manufacturers build into their vehicles)
PERN	Packaging Export Recovery Note
PET	Polyethylene Terephthalate
PFI	Private Finance Initiative
PIU	Performance and Innovation Unit
PM	Particulate Matter, airborne (e.g. PM 10 ~ particles under 10 micrometres)
PP	Polypropylene
PP	Proximity Principle
PPC	Pollution Prevention and Control Act
PPE	Personal Protective Equipment
PPG	Planning Policy Guidance Notes (e.g. PPG 10 for waste management)
PPP	Public Private Partnership or  Polluter-pays principle
PPS	Planning Policy Statement
PR	Producer Responsibility
PRF    Plastics Reclamation Facility
PRN	Packaging Recovery Note
PS	Polystyrene
PSA	Public Service Agreement
PUWER	Provision and Use of Work Equipment Regulations
PVB    Polyvinyl Butyral
PVC	Polyvinyl Chloride

Q
QMS	Quality Management System
QP     Quality Protocol
QUANGO	Quasi Autonomous Non-Governmental Organisation
QESH  Quality, Environment, Safety and Health
QUENSH QUality, ENvironment, Safety and Health

R
3Rs    Reduce, Reuse, Recycle
RAD    Rotary Aerobic Digestion
RAG	Recycling Advisory Group, Scotland
RCE	Regional Centre of Excellence
RCEP	Royal Commission on Environmental Pollution
RCRA   Resource Conservation and Recovery Act (US)
RCV	Refuse Collection Vehicle
RDA	Regional Development Agency  (all abolished in England on 31 March 2012)
RDF	Refuse Derived Fuel
REACH  Registration, Evaluation, Authorisation and Restriction of Chemicals
RECAP  Recycling in Cambridgeshire and Peterborough
RECOUP	Recycling Of Used Plastics
REL	Rear End Loader
REMADE	Recycled Market Development
REPAC	Regional Environmental Protection Advisory Committee
RFID	Radio Frequency Identification
RIA	Regulatory Impact Assessment
RID	Regulations concerning the International Carriage of Dangerous Goods by Rail
RIDDOR	Reporting of Injuries, Diseases and Dangerous Occurrences Regulations 1995
RGN	Regulatory Guidance Note
RMA    U.S. Rubber Manufacturers Association
RO	Renewables Obligation
ROC	Renewables Obligation Certificates
RoHS	Restriction of Hazardous Substances
RoRo	Rolonof/Roll-on Roll-off, demountable container system
ROTATE	Recycling and Organic Technology Advisory Team
RSA    Recycled & Secondary Aggregate
RSA    Restoring Sustainable Abstraction
RTAB	Regional Technical Advisory Body
RVM    Reverse Vending Machine
RWM    Recycling and Waste Management Exhibition
RWMO   Radioactive Waste Management Organisation

S
SEA	Strategic Environmental Assessment
SEI    Sustainable Electronics Initiative
SELCHP South East London Combined Heat and Power 
SEPA	Scottish Environment Protection Agency
SGV	Soil Guideline Value
SIG	Special Interest Group of CIWM
SLF	Secondary Liquid Fuel
SLWP   South London Waste Partnership
SMDSA	Sanitary Medical Disposal Services Association
SNIFFER	Scotland and Northern Ireland Forum for Environmental Research
SNRHW	Stable Non-Reactive Hazardous Wastes
SocEnv	Society for the Environment
SRB	Single Regeneration Budget
SRF    Secondary Recovered Fuel or Solid or Specified
SSWAT  Site Specific Waste Analysis Tool
STA       Source Testing Association
SWA	Solid Waste Analysis
SWAG	Scottish Waste Advisory Group
SWCN   Special Waste Consignment Note
SWDF	Solid Waste Disposal Facilities
SWDWP  South West Devon Waste Partnership
SWEN	Special Waste Explanatory Note
SWF	Strategic Waste Fund (Scotland)
SWM	Sustainable Waste Management
SWMA	Strategic Waste Management Assessment
SWMP   Site Waste Management Plan
SWP    Shropshire Waste Partnership or Somerset Waste Partnership or Surrey Waste Partnership

T
TAC	Technical Adaptation Committee
TAD    Thermophilic Aerobic Digestion
TCLP   Toxicity Characteristic Leaching Procedure
TAN	Technical Advice Note (Wales)
TEEP   Technically, Environmentally and Economically Practicable
TEF	Toxic Equivalent Factor
TFS	Transfrontier Shipment
THP    Thermal hydrolysis
TLS    Transfer Loading Station
tpa	tonnes per annum
TRACS  Tyre Recovery Activity Compliance Scheme (Ireland)
TRAID  Textile Recycling for Aid and International Development
TRF    Thermal Recovery Facility
TRIF	Technology and Research Innovation Fund
TT     Thermal Treatment
TUPE   Transfer of Undertakings (Protection of Employment)

U
UA	Unitary Authority
UASB	Upflow anaerobic sludge blanket digestion
UBC	Used Beverage Can
UDP	Unitary Development Plan
UEL	Upper Explosive Limit
UEEE   Used Electrical and Electronic Equipment
UKELA  UK Environmental Law Association
UKWIN  United Kingdom Without Incineration
UNEP	United Nations Environment Programme
UROC   United Resource Operators Confederation

V
VCU	Vertical Composting Units
VLLW   Very Low Level Waste
VOC	Volatile Organic Compound
VRQ	Vocationally Related Qualification

W
WAC	Waste Acceptance Criteria 
WAG	Welsh Assembly Government
WAMITAB	Waste Management Industry Training & Advisory Board
WARRAG	Waste And Resources Research Advisory Group
WCA	Waste Collection Authority
WDA	Waste Disposal Authority
WDF    WasteDataFlow (web-based system for municipal waste data reporting by UK local authorities)
WEEE	Waste Electrical and Electronic Equipment 
WET	Waste and Emissions Trading Act 2003
WFD	Waste Framework Directive 
WID	Waste Incineration Directive 
WIP	Waste Implementation Programme
WIPP	Waste Isolation Pilot Plant
WISARD	Waste Integrated Systems Assessment for Recovery and Disposal
WLP	Waste Local Plan
WLWA   West London Waste Authority
WM2    Technical Guidance WM2 Hazardous Waste: Interpretation of the definition and classification of hazardous waste 
WMF    Waste Management Facility
WML	Waste Management Licence  (replaced by Environmental Permits)
WMP	Waste Management Plan
WMPEG	Waste Minimisation Performance and Efficiency Grant
WMS    Waste Management Strategy
WRAP	Waste and Resources Action Programme
WRATE  Waste and Resources Assessment Tool for the Environment
WRG    Waste Recycling Group
WRWA   Western Riverside Waste Authority
WS2007 Waste Strategy for England 2007 (superseded by the Waste Management Plan for England (2013)) 
WSA	Waste Strategy Area (e.g. 11 WSAs in Scotland)
WtE    Waste-to-Energy
WTF    Waste Transfer Facility
WTN    Waste Transfer Note

X
XRF    X-Ray Fluorescence  (i.e. checking for the presence of metals in waste plastics)

Y
YNYWMP York and North Yorkshire Waste Management Partnership

Z
ZWS    Zero Waste Scotland

See also
Chartered Institution of Wastes Management
List of waste management concepts

References

External links
Waste management acronyms
Waste on All Acronyms

Acronyms

Waste management acronyms
Waste Management
Waste